Nedakusi (Montenegrin Cyrillic:Недакуси) is a village in the municipality of Bijelo Polje, Montenegro. It is located just north of the town of Bijelo Polje.

Demographics
According to the 2003 census, the village had a population of 2,308 people.

According to the 2011 census, its population was 2,158.

References

Populated places in Bijelo Polje Municipality
Serb communities in Montenegro